Don't Waste Your Time may refer to:

 "Don't Waste Your Time" (Kelly Clarkson song), 2007
 "Don't Waste Your Time" (Yarbrough & Peoples song), 1984
 "Don't Waste Your Time", a song by Mary J. Blige and Aretha Franklin from Mary